State Highway 171 (SH 171) is a  southeast–northwest state highway in northeastern Texas, United States, that connects U.S. Highway 84 (US 84) in Mexia with U.S. Highway 180 (US 180) in Weatherford.

Route description
SH 171 begins at an intersection with US 84 in Mexia, before quickly intersecting State Highway 14. Leaving the town, SH 171 runs northwest to Tehuacana, before running in a more west direction to Coolidge. The highway runs in a northwest direction again, running through the towns of Hubbard and Malone before entering Hillsboro. SH 171 runs through the town overlapped with State Highway 22, before running in a mostly north direction towards Cleburne. In Cleburne, SH 171 shares an overlap with State Highway 174 through the city. After crossing U.S. Route 67 and the Chisholm Trail Parkway, the highway turns back in a more northwest direction towards Godley and Cresson. After Cresson, SH 171 briefly has a run in Hood County before entering Parker County. The highway enters into Weatherford, where it ends in downtown at an intersection with US 180.

History
The route was originally designated on August 3, 1932 along the portion between Hillsboro and Coolidge. On July 15, 1935, the section from Coolidge to Hubbard was cancelled. On September 22, 1936, this section was restored. On January 18, 1937, the route had been extended to Covington. On March 16, 1937, the section from Hubbard to Munger was cancelled due to a lateral project. This section was restored on October 24, 1938. On October 25, 1938, SH 171 was extended southeast to Mexia along the old route of US 84/SH 7. On September 26, 1939, SH 171 was extended to the northwest significantly, absorbing portions of SH 2A and all of SH 122.

Major intersections

See also

 List of state highways in Texas
 List of highways numbered 171

References

External links

171
Transportation in Limestone County, Texas
Transportation in Hill County, Texas
Transportation in Johnson County, Texas
Transportation in Hood County, Texas
Transportation in Parker County, Texas